Samuel Thomas Bowen (born September 18, 1952) is a former outfielder in Major League Baseball who played between 1977 and 1980 for the Boston Red Sox. He batted and threw right-handed. In a three-season career, Bowen posted a .136 batting average (3-for-22) with one home run, one RBI, three runs, and one stolen base in 16 games played.

Amateur career
With very few opportunities at the major league level, Bowen was not able to fulfill his real potential after a solid career at Valdosta State University. He was drafted four times (Cleveland, Montreal, Atlanta, California) prior to signing with the Boston Red Sox in 1974, and is one of very few players to be drafted five times.

Professional career
He spent three seasons in the Boston minor league system before earning a promotion to the Red Sox in 1977, after hitting .265 with 15 home runs and 49 RBI for Triple-A Pawtucket Red Sox. He started 1978 in Triple-A and was recalled during the midseason to replace departed Bernie Carbo. After that, he led Pawtucket with 28 home runs and 75 RBI in 1979, and played his last professional season in 1982, while dividing his playing time between Pawtucket and Boston.

Honors
Bowen was inducted into the VSU Hall of Fame in 1997 and also in March 2013 was inducted into the Glynn County Hall of Fame in his hometown of Brunswick, Georgia.

External links

Baseball Library
Retrosheet
Sons of Sam Horn
VSU Athletic Hall of Fame

Major League Baseball outfielders
Boston Red Sox players
Bristol Red Sox players
Charleston Charlies players
Elmira Pioneers players
Pawtucket Red Sox players
Winter Haven Red Sox players
Baseball players from Georgia (U.S. state)
People from Brunswick, Georgia
1952 births
Living people
Valdosta State Blazers baseball players